Sar Hammam-e Abu ol Hasan (also Romanized as Sar Ḩammām-e Abū ol Ḩasan Kolā) is a village in Gatab-e Jonubi Rural District, Gatab District, Babol County, Mazandaran Province, Iran. At the 2006 census, its population was 414, in 105 families.

References 

Populated places in Babol County